is a Quasi-National Park in Shimane Prefecture, Hiroshima Prefecture, and Yamaguchi Prefecture, Japan.

Overview

There are virgin forests of Japanese beeches, Japanese oaks and Japanese horse chestnut.

There are Asiatic black bears, Japanese macaques, mountain hawk eagles and Japanese giant salamanders.

Mountains
Mount Osorakan 
Mount Kanmuri (Mount Yoshiwa Kanmuri) 
Mount Jakuchi 
Mount Garyu 
Mount Asa

Ravines
Sandan-kyō
Hikimi-kyō
Fukatani-kyō
Jakuchi-kyō
Souzu-kyō

See also

List of national parks of Japan

References

External links
Ministry of the Environment

National parks of Japan
Parks and gardens in Hiroshima Prefecture
Parks and gardens in Shimane Prefecture
Parks and gardens in Yamaguchi Prefecture
Protected areas established in 1969